Runkle v. United States, 122 U.S. 543 (1887), was a case in which the Supreme Court of the United States determined that the president cannot delegate the power vested in him to approve the proceedings and sentence of a court-martial because the president is the only person bestowed with the judicial power of making a final determination.

Background
Benjamin Piatt Runkle, a Civil War veteran who was wounded at the Battle of Shiloh, was, from 1867 to 1870, serving as an active duty army major and disbursing officer in the Freedmen's Bureau for the State of Kentucky. In 1870, he was placed on the retired list as a major, but continued as a disbursing officer, until he was arrested and tried before a court-martial. The court-martial found Runkle guilty of  conduct unbecoming an officer and gentleman and of violating the March 2, 1863, c. 67, § 1, Act of Congress. His sentence was imprisonment, payment of a fine, and dismissal from the army, where he had been serving on the retired list and drawing retired pay. The Secretary of War, W. W. Belknap, reviewed the proceedings and in 1873 issued an order approving Runkle's conviction, but in consideration of his war service and wounds, granted Runkle executive clemency in the name of the President and eliminated the fine and prison sentence. However, his dismissal from the army remained in effect. Under the law at that time, any court martial sentence involving an officer's dismissal in peacetime needed to be confirmed by the President and there was no indication in this order that the conviction was confirmed by President Ulysses S. Grant.

On the same day that he was cashiered, Runkle petitioned President Grant, complaining that his sentence had not been confirmed by the President himself. This petition was referred by Grant to the Judge Advocate General for review. It remained open when President Rutherford B. Hayes came into office, as President Grant had done nothing further in the matter. Hayes then picked it up as unfinished business and registered an order of disapproval, revoking the 1873 order dismissing Runkle.

The August 4, 1877 executive order of President Hayes, disapproving the conviction, details the history:

On the authority of the executive order, Runkle was given retirement pay – both from the date of the Hayes order going forward and back pay to the date he was dismissed. In 1882, he made a claim for additional longevity pay, which was referred to the Court of Claims. In the Court of Claims the government challenged his right to any pay at all, asserting that Hayes did not have the right to revoke the 1873 order confirming Runkle's dismissal.

Opinion of the Court
The opinion of the Court, delivered by Chief Justice Waite, concludes:

Subsequent developments
Subsequent cases, United States v. Fletcher, 148 U.S. 84 (1893) and Bishop v. United States, 197 U.S. 334 (1905), both, in effect, repudiate the Runkle decision, in that the Runkle circumstances were so exceptional that it is not a safe precedent.

From the Fletcher decision:

However, according to Joshua Kastenberg, a professor of law at the University of New Mexico, the Supreme court, in 1958 in Harmon v. Brucker, 355 U.S. 579 (1958) reaffirmed a basic tenet of Runkle without citing to the case.  A president, as well as the Department of Defense, is bound by its own internal rules.  (The Court, in Vitarelli v. Seaton and Service v. Dulles also determined this rule applied to civil service positions outside of the military establishment).  Thus, Runkle remains an important part of the military law.  Moreover, there is a corollary rule in Runkle that a president must also follow statutory law in regard to courts-martial.

See also
 United States v. Fletcher, 
 Bishop v. United States,

References

External links

1887 in United States case law
United States Supreme Court cases
United States Supreme Court cases of the Waite Court
Courts-martial in the United States
Court-martial cases
Freedmen's Bureau